Maurice "Verse" Simmonds is a Puerto Rican/Virgin Islander rapper, singer, composer, record producer, and record executive. Based in Los Angeles, California but raised in the Virgin Islands, he moved to the United States after high school and he formed the production duo the Jugganauts in the 1990s. The duo has since co-written and produced tracks such as "Man Down" by Rihanna and "Who Gon Stop Me" by Kanye West and Jay-Z, both of which charted prominently on Billboard.

Around 2007, Simmonds began releasing his own solo material, and his 2011 single "Boo Thang" featuring Kelly Rowland on Def Jam peaked at No. 44 on the Billboard Hot R&B/Hip-Hop Songs chart. He has also released a number of full-length mixtapes, rapping and singing over many of the tracks and also bringing in guest artists such as Young Jeezy, Akon, Snoop Dogg, and Travis Porter. Under his birth name or as Verse Simmonds he has co-written a number of charting R&B songs, such as "Confident" by Justin Bieber and Chance the Rapper, and "New Flame" by Chris Brown, Usher and Rick Ross. The latter earned Simmonds his first Grammy Award nomination for Best R&B Song in 2015.

Early life and music
Maurice Simmonds was born in Puerto Rico. Raised in the Virgin Islands, he spent his youth on the island of Saint Thomas. Introduced to music primarily through the radio, in high school he and several friends formed the musical group 2 Xtreme, performing at local venues and talent shows. He moved to Fort Lauderdale in Florida after graduating high school, where he continued to work on hip hop production and songwriting. In 1996 in Fort Lauderdale Simmonds met and befriended the producer and songwriter Shama Joseph, and together they formed the production duo the Jugganauts. The Jugganauts moved to Los Angeles, California in 2003 to work on a number of projects for major record labels. Several years later Simmonds was contacted by Theron Thomas, a childhood friend and member of the production duo Rock City. Thomas convinced the Jugganauts to move to Atlanta, Georgia, where they began recording with producers such as Rodney Jerkins and Akon.

Music career

First solo releases (2009-2010)

After moving to Atlanta Simmonds began working more intently on his own solo material, both performing and recording original material around the city. In February 2007, he became associated as a solo artist with Cloud 9 and Raydar Management, and one of his live shows led to a contract with Interscope Records. Simmonds released his first solo track on Interscope on June 30, 2009. Titled "Buy You a Round (Up and Down)," AllMusic called it "a cocky, percussion-heavy club single" that "enabled the upcoming singer, songwriter, and occasional MC to tour extensively." "Buy You A Round (Up And Down)" peaked at No. 55 on the Billboard Hot R&B/Hip-Hop Songs chart and at No. 63 on the  Hot R&B/Hip-Hop Airplay chart. An official music video for the track was uploaded to VEVO on November 22, 2009.

Simmonds released a mixtape in August 2009, titled The Sextape Chronicles. Sham and Simmonds served as executive producers, with Raydar, Cloud9, Darkchild, and DJ Trauma listed in the credits as presenters. In December 2009, a track with co-writing by Simmonds was included on the R. Kelly album Untitled. The album ultimately went on to be nominated for a Grammy Award. In 2010, a number of Simmonds' recent tracks were included in the free V The Compilation Vol. 2 mixtape, which was presented by DJ Ill Will.

"Boo Thang" and mixtapes (2011-2012)
He signed to Konvict Muzik as a singer-songwriter and producer in January 2011, also becoming associated with MVD Inc. and the Konlive imprint. Later in 2011 he signed to Bu Vision, a label run by Akon's brother Bu Thiam and affiliated with Def Jam and Konlive. Simmonds' August 2011 mixtape The Sextape Chronicles 2 was released through Bu Vision, Konlive, and Carteblanche, and listed hosts such as Angela Yee. In 2011 he worked as The Jugganauts with his production partner Sham on both writing and producing the reggae-infused song "Man Down" for Rihanna's album  Loud. Also with Sham, he worked on "Who Gon Stop Me" by Kanye West and Jay-Z for the Watch the Throne album.

Through Bu Vision, in September 2011, Simmonds released his single "Boo Thang," featuring Kelly Rowland. As described by MTV, apart from Rowland's vocals, "Verse starts by rapping over a midtempo piano-laced track. His raps give way to a melodic refrain that he sings, leading him all the way to the hook." A music video directed by Gil Green and starring Rowlands and Simmonds was released to accompany the single. "Boo Thang" peaked at No. 66 on the Billboard Hot R&B/Hip-Hop Songs chart and at No. 44 on the Hot R&B/Hip-Hop Airplay chart. The song was ultimately included on Simmonds' mixtape Sextape Chronicles 2.

Mixtapes and EPs (2012-2013)
His April 2012 mixtape Sex Love & Hip Hop was hosted by DJ Drama, with other guest artists such as Yo Gotti, Kelly Rowland, Snoop Dogg and Akon. The third in his Sex Tape Chronicles series, Simmonds at the time called it his "biggest mixtape." In August 2012, he self-released A Sextape Chronicle, a six-track EP, and his October 2012 mixtape Fuck Your Feelings featured guest artists such as Red Cafe, Gucci Mane, and Young Jeezy. In late 2012, he contributed to studio sessions involving recording artist Omotola Jalade Ekeinde.

Simmonds' track "Fully Loaded," featuring Young Jeezy, came out on June 11, 2013 on BuVision, and also that year Simmonds released the "Who U Wit" with features from Trouble and Yo Gotti. Simmonds' mixtape Fuck Your Feelings 2 was released for free on June 12, 2013. His six track EP Circa 96: A Prelude to 1996 came out in August 2013 as a free mixtape. Drop FM gave it a score of 7/10 and a positive review, writing that Simmonds can "create a ’90s-inspired project that still sounds fresh and modern." The review opined the fact that Simmonds "stayed true to the 1996 concept by using traditional R&B sounds and a throwback vocal delivery," and "made songs that should be able to keep the listeners' attention throughout." Also in 2013, Simmonds' collaborated with Cap 1 on a mixtape titled Champagne Poets. Released in November 2013, it featured artists such as 2 Chainz and Travis Porter.

Recent releases (2013-2015)
In 2013, he participated as a writer on a number of collaborations, for example co-writing the Justin Bieber song "Confident", which featured Chance the Rapper and had hip hop and reggae elements. In 2013 and 2014, he co-wrote six songs on the Chris Brown album X, after taking part in a writing camp put on by RCA Records. One of the tracks, a promo single titled "Don't Think They Know", came out in late 2013 and peaked at No. 81 on the Billboard Hot 100. Other tracks he co-wrote on the album featured artists such as Jhené Aiko and Trey Songz, while "Love More" featured Nicki Minaj and reached No. 23 on the Hot 100 chart. The album's track "New Flame", which featured Usher and Rick Ross, went on to be nominated for Best R&B Song at the 57th Annual Grammy Awards in 2015.

In February 2014 Simmonds self-released the single "Best Sex Eva" on his own Simmonds & Company  imprint. Also in February 2014, a song he co-wrote titled "Private" was included on the T.I. album Paperwork. Simmonds then released his single "Situationships" on March 24, 2015. The track featured co-production from Needlz and Donut, and the publication Complex wrote that with the lyrics "Simmonds goes in on different types of relationships that go against the grain." The official music video for "Situationships" came out on VEVO on June 17, 2015.

His mixtape Fuck Your Feelings 3 was released on July 15, 2015. The publication Uproxx wrote that Fvck Your Feelings 3 "is how it’s supposed to be done. Verse Simmonds mixes up a stiff drink and hits the club for a much needed remix to Drake and P... the remix cuts out the weakest link, keeps Drizzy and Future’s hook on blast and features a mandatory explicit sixteen from Verse." Through the label VVS Society, in July 2015, Simmonds released two singles: "All I Want" featuring Jeremih, and "Luv In It" featuring Migos.

Musical style and influences
Simmonds has self-identified his vocal stylings as "R&B, hip-hop, reggae and calypso," and he has also described the genre of his original music as "island B," for being "a mixture of R&B, a little bit of Caribbean flavor and hip hop." About his lyrics, among other topics he has stated that he finds women to be "inspiration" and relationships are a commons theme throughout his mixtapes.

Awards and nominations

Discography

Mixtapes

EPs

Singles

Guest credits

Videography

Further reading
Interviews and articles 

 

Discographies
Verse Simmonds at AllMusic
Verse Simmonds at Discogs

See also
List of hip hop musicians
Hip hop of the Virgin Islands

References

External links
VerseSimmonds.com 
Verse Simmonds on Facebook
Verse Simmonds on Twitter 
Audio and video
Verse Simmonds on SoundCloud
Verse Simmonds on YouTube
Verse Simmonds on VEVO

Living people
American hip hop record producers
American hip hop singers
American rappers
Puerto Rican hip hop musicians
Rappers from Atlanta
Year of birth missing (living people)
21st-century American rappers